or  is a lake in the municipality of Røyrvik in Trøndelag county, Norway. The water from the  lake flows out through the river Orelva into the lake Namsvatnet.

See also
 List of lakes in Norway

References

Lakes of Trøndelag
Røyrvik